Infante Henry of Aragon (1400 – 15 June 1445), 1st Duke of Villena, 4th Count of Alburquerque, Count of Ampurias, was the Grand Master of the Order of Santiago.

Childhood 
A member of the House of Trastamara, Henry was the third son of King Ferdinand I of Aragon and Eleanor of Alburquerque, 3rd Countess of Alburquerque. His older brothers were King Alfonso V of Aragon and King John II of Navarre but Henry's main estates were in Castile, left to him by his parents. As a child, Infante Henry came to the Castilian royal court, his paternal uncle, King Henry III of Castile, having secured a place for him in the royal council of Henry's five years younger cousin, King John II of Castile.

In 1409, Lorenzo Suárez de Figueroa, Grand Master of the Order of Santiago, died. Infante Henry was proclaimed the new Grand Master despite being a child of merely nine years. After the death of his aunt, Catherine of Lancaster, Henry aspired to influence his weak cousin John's reign and get a grip on power.

First marriage 
In November 1418, Henry married his first cousin, Infanta Catherine of Castile, the sister of King John II of Castile. The marriage was a part of an agreement by which Henry's older brother Alfonso V married Catherine's older sister Maria and by which Henry's sister Maria married Catherine's brother John II. Marriage to the King's sister increased Henry's power even more, to the point that the King began to consider him a threat and started seeking support in Álvaro de Luna.

Struggle for power 
In 1420, Henry, with the help of some other noblemen, laid siege to the castle in which John II was residing, claiming that the King had been kidnapped by de Luna and demanding the King's surrender. After a few days, however, he lost the support of the noblemen and had to give up. The Infante was arrested and charged with treason and imprisoned in the Castle of Mora. He was released thanks to the efforts of his brother, after which he fled into exile.

After Álvaro de Luna was disgraced in 1427, Henry regained some of his former power. He and his wife returned to Castile to claim her inheritance and they were successful; having already been granted the Dukedom of Villena by her brother, they received the rest of her dowry. In 1429, his brothers, the King of Aragon and the King of Navarre, declared war on Castile and had the Duke of Villena's support. The war was avoided thanks to their sister Maria's efforts. Henry then had to flee again, this time seeking shelter in the Kingdom of Naples. Alfonso was there fighting for the crown of Naples. Villena was helping Alfonso when he was imprisoned in August 1435 after a battle along with him and their brother John. They were again liberated thanks to the efforts of their sister, the Queen of Castile.

His mother died in 1435, having willed her comital title to Henry. The new Count of Alburquerque returned to Castile one last time in 1438, after an uprising of the noblemen. He took part in the uprising and armed conflicts with his brother-in-law.

Second marriage 
In October 1439, his wife Catherine died after suffering a miscarriage. Their marriage was childless and her brother confiscated the Dukedom of Villena which he had given to her. Shortly thereafter, the widowed Infante married Beatriz de Pimentel, by whom he had one child:

Henry of Aragon (1445–1522), 1st Duke of Segorbe, whose granddaughter Anne was the last member of the House of Trastamara.  

In 1445, Henry took part in the First Battle of Olmedo, helping his brother, the King of Navarre, against their brother-in-law, the King of Castile. According to one theory, the King of Navarre planned to conquer the southern part of the Kingdom of Castile and proclaim Henry its king. However, Henry was wounded and died of infection a few weeks later.

Aragonese infantes
House of Trastámara
Grand Masters of the Order of Santiago
Sons of kings